Mark Hillman was elected to the Colorado State Senate in 1998.  He served as Majority Leader from 2003 to 2004 and Minority Leader in 2005 before serving as State Treasurer from 2005 to 2006. He is a member of the Republican Party and was elected Republican National Committeeman on May 31, 2008.

Early life

Hillman grew up working his parents' farm in Burlington on Colorado's eastern plains.  During high school, he took a part-time job with his hometown newspaper, the Burlington Record.  After graduating from Burlington High School in 1985, he became a full-time sports editor, news reporter, photographer, and "jack of all trades."  In 1994, Hillman left the paper to work the family farm.

Education

Hillman took classes at Colby Community College in Kansas, Morgan Community College, and Regis University. He did not complete a degree.

Political career

Colorado State Senate

Hillman announced his candidacy for the State Senate in late 1997. Hillman was elected to leadership posts for five of his seven years in the Senate, including both Majority Leader and Minority Leader.

Hillman received National Legislator of the Year honors from the American Legislative Exchange Council (ALEC), "Taxpayer Champion" from the Colorado Union of Taxpayers, and other awards in Colorado, including recognition from the Colorado Farm Bureau, the National Federation of Independent Business, the Colorado Civil Justice League, and the Colorado Association of Commerce and Industry.

Colorado State Treasurer

Hillman was appointed as Colorado's State Treasurer in June 2005 by Governor Bill Owens.

Republican National Committeeman

At the Republican State Convention on May 31, 2008, former United States Senator William L. Armstrong nominated Hillman for Republican National Committeeman, calling him "one of the greatest legislators in the history of Colorado."  Hillman won and replaced United States Senate candidate Bob Schaffer as one of Colorado's three Republican National Committeemen.

Personal life

Mark married Heidi Horvath on July 16, 2005.

References

External links

Mark Hillman website

Living people
State treasurers of Colorado
Republican Party Colorado state senators
People from Burlington, Colorado
Year of birth missing (living people)